Swiftopecten is a genus of bivalves belonging to the family Pectinidae.

The species of this genus are found in Western North America, Alaska, Japan.

Species:
Swiftopecten djoserus 
Swiftopecten iheringii 
Swiftopecten swiftii

References

Pectinidae
Bivalve genera